The 1941–42 Michigan Wolverines men's basketball team represented the University of Michigan in intercollegiate basketball during the 1941–42 season.  The team finished the season in a tie for seventh place in the Big Ten Conference with an overall record of 6–14 and 5–10 against conference opponents.

Bennie Oosterbaan was in his fourth year as the team's head coach.  James Mandler broke Michigan's single-season scoring record with 230 points in 20 games for an average of 11.5 points per game.  William Cartmill was the team captain.

Statistical leaders

References

Michigan
Michigan Wolverines men's basketball seasons
Michigan Wolverines basketball
Michigan Wolverines basketball